The Parnall Scout, unofficially nicknamed the Zeppelin Chaser, was a British fighter prototype of the 1910s. It was the first fighter design from Parnall.

Development
Parnall began work on a single-seat anti-airship fighter aircraft in 1916 based on the designs of A. Camden-Pratt, initially intended to meet an aircraft specification from the Admiralty. A large, wooden two-bay staggered biplane, it was finished and initially tested in late 1916.

Operational history
The Scout reportedly flew twice in late 1916 under Admiralty testing, however it was found to be heavy, slow and unsafe. As such it was returned to Parnall in the same year and no further development progressed.

Specifications (Scout - estimated)

Notes

References

Further reading

 

Scout
1910s British fighter aircraft
Single-engined tractor aircraft
Biplanes
Aircraft first flown in 1916